Hitomi Kaji (加治ひとみ) is a Japanese pop singer, songwriter under the label Avex Trax.

Biography
In 2012 March, the new J-pop duo KAJI on the INTELLIGENCE performed their at the Yokohama Arena as the opening act during the 14th Tokyo Girls Collection 2012 SPRING/SUMMER on 3 March just before their official debut. The duo consists of sound producer Hayato Tanaka and singer-songwriter KAJI. They released their debut digital single KARADA on 4 April 2012.

In 2014 September, avex held the TOKYO GIRLS AUDITION 2014. After going through various auditions and hardwork, Hitomi Kaji won the artist Grand Prix award. After which, her debut was decided and it was unveiled to 30,000 audiences on stage during the Tokyo Girls Collection 2015 SPRING / SUMMER. She visited the modelpress Japan and share her life experiences throughout the audition, apart from her outstanding singing talent and ability.
Her debut mini album will be scheduled for release on 27 January 2016, with total of seven songs.

Discography

Singles

Split Singles

Digital Singles

Mini albums

Albums

Other appearances

Videography

Idol DVD

Music videos

References

External links
Official Website (Japanese)

1987 births
Living people
Avex Group artists
Japanese pop musicians
Japanese women pop singers
21st-century Japanese singers
21st-century Japanese women singers